The House at 18 Walnut Street in Southbridge, Massachusetts is one of two modest yet remarkably high Shingle Style houses on Walnut Street in Southbridge, Massachusetts.  It was built c. 1898 by George Wells, president of the locally important American Optical Company, apparently to provide worker housing for company employees.  Of the two houses Wells had built, this one is the best preserved.  It has a slate gambrel roof with projecting sections.

The house was listed on the National Register of Historic Places in 1989.  Its original shingle siding has been replaced, as has the diamond-lighted bay window projecting from the front gable end.

See also
National Register of Historic Places listings in Southbridge, Massachusetts
National Register of Historic Places listings in Worcester County, Massachusetts

References

Houses in Southbridge, Massachusetts
Houses completed in 1898
Shingle Style houses
National Register of Historic Places in Southbridge, Massachusetts
Houses on the National Register of Historic Places in Worcester County, Massachusetts
Shingle Style architecture in Massachusetts